The culture of Ladakh refers to the traditional customs, belief systems, and political systems that are followed by Ladakhi people in India. The languages, religions, dance, music, architecture, food, and customs of the Ladakh region are similar to neighboring Tibet. Ladakhi is the traditional language of Ladakh. The popular dances in Ladakh include the khatok chenmo, cham, etc. The people of Ladakh also celebrate several festivals throughout the year, some of the most famous are Hemis Tsechu and Losar.

Background

Ladakh is the northmost part of India. Ladakh shares a border with Tibet  to the east, the Indian state of Himachal Pradesh and the union territory of Jammu and Kashmir to the south, and Gilgit-Baltistan to the west. It extends from the Siachen Glacier in the Karakoram range jn the north to the Great Himalayas to the south. Formerly, it was a part of the Indian state of Jammu and Kashmir, but after the Jammu and Kashmir Reorganisation Act (2019), it was separated from Jammu and Kashmir and was converted to a Union Territory. Parts of Ladakh have been the subject of dispute between India, Pakistan, and China since 1947.

Ladakh incorporates parts of the Himalayan and Karakoram mountain ranges and the upper Indus River valley. It is the only cold desert in India. Its topography is barren and population sparse inhabited along the river banks of different valleys namely Indus, Nubra, Changthang, and Zanskar. Women in Ladakh enjoy high status in comparison to rest of the nation, especially rural areas. Ladakh's languages, religions, dance, music, architecture, food, and customs are similar to neighboring Tibet.

Language

The Ladakhi language is a Tibetic language spoken in Ladakh, which is also called Bhoti or Bodhi. As per the 2011 census, approximately 110,826 people speak Ladakhi. Ladakhi has absorbed words from the silk route trade. It is usually written using Tibetan script with the pronunciation of Ladakhi being much closer to written Classical Tibetan.

Music

The traditional music of Ladakh includes instruments like linyu (flute), damnyan (stringed instrument) pivang, khakong, (sitar) daph (dafli) daman, surna, and piwang (shehnai and drum). Chanting of mantras in Sanskrit and the Tibetan language plays an important role in Ladakhi music. Folk music is an integral part of Ladakh's culture. Music is often inspired by the surrounding physical features. Morup Namgyal is an avid preservationist and during his 30-year career working at Ladakh's only radio station (All India Radio, Leh) he recorded a vast archive of Ladakhi folk songs.

Dance

The popular dances in Ladakh include the Khatok Chenmo which is headed by a respectable family member, Shondol, Some other dance forms include Kompa Tsum-tsak Jabro Chaams: Chabs-Skyan Tses Raldi Tses and Alley Yaato. The music of Ladakhi monastic festivals, like various forms of Tibetan music, often involves chanting as an integral part of the religion. Traditionally, 360 variants of dances existed in the early times, but today only a few are preserved. These chants are complex, often recitations of sacred texts and manuscripts or in celebration of different festivals. Some forms of dance narrate the story of the fight between good and evil, ending with the eventual victory of the former.

Cuisine 

Ladakhi food is much common as Tibetan food, the most prominent dishes being thukpa, a type of noodle soup and tsampa, known in Ladakhi as ngampe, which is a type of roasted barley flour. Strictly Ladakhi dishes include skyu and chutagi, both heavy and rich soup pasta dishes, skyu being made with root vegetables and meat, and chutagi with leafy greens and vegetables. As Ladakh tourism and modernization increased in Ladakh, foods from the plains of India are becoming more common.

Festivals and events
Ladakh has several festivals throughout the year, including Hemis Tsechu and Losar. Ladakh's festivals comprise mask dances performed by people, games such as  camel races, river rafting and archery, regional music and dance performances, thangka exhibitions, etc. People of Ladakh also celebrate several festivals throughout the year, some of the most famous ones are Hemis Tsechu and Saka Dawa. A lot of their time is also spent in making stone jewellery, woolen clothes, and mural paintings on the walls of the monasteries. Weaving is considered as an essential part of traditional life in eastern Ladakh. Some festivals of Ladakh are:
 Hemis Festival - Hemis Monastery has an annual festival named after it.
 Losar - Losar, also known as Tibetan New Year, is a festival in Tibetan Buddhism.
 Phyang Tsedup Festival - This festival is celebrated every fifth month of the Tibetan lunar calendar.
 Sindhu Darshan Festival - It is held on every Guru Purnima on the banks of the Indus river.
 Dosmoche - It is celebrated every 12th month of the Tibetan calendar every year.
 Saka Dawa Festival.
 Tak - Tok Festival - It is one of the major festivals of Ladakh. It is celebrated at cave Gompa of Tak- Tok.
 Matho Nagrang Festival.

Cultural centers

Buddhist monasteries are often situated on an isolated hillock in the vicinity of villages. These monasteries provide the focus for the faith of the religious Buddhist people. Some monasteries and cultural centers of Ladakh are:
 Thikse Monastery
 Lamayuru Monastery
 Hemis Monastery
 Stok Monastery
 Leh Palace
 Chemrey Monastery
 Shey Monastery
 Diskit Monastery
Both Leh and Shey monasteries have carved Buddhas, mostly of the Maitreya.

See also

Ladakh
Music of Ladakh

References

Ladakh
Indian culture